Cotton Center High School or Cotton Center School is a public school located in unincorporated Cotton Center, Texas (USA), a small farming community in the southern panhandle portion of the state and classified as a 1A school by the UIL.  The school is part of the Cotton Center Independent School District which encompasses west central Hale County.   In 2015, the school was rated "Met Standard" by the Texas Education Agency.

Athletics
The Cotton Center Elks compete in the following sports - 

Cross Country
6-Man Football
Basketball
Golf
Tennis
Track and Field

State Finalists

Girls Basketball - 
1955(B)
Football - 
1978(6M), 1979(6M)

References

External links
Cotton Center Independent School District
List of Six-man football stadiums in Texas

Schools in Hale County, Texas
Public high schools in Texas
Public middle schools in Texas
Public elementary schools in Texas